Pawnee (Pawnee: Paári) is a city and county seat of Pawnee County, Oklahoma, United States. The town is northeast of Stillwater at the junction of U.S. Route 64 and State Highway 18.

It was named for the Pawnee tribe, which was relocated to this area between 1873 and 1875. The population was 2,190 at the 2010 census, a decline of 1.5 percent from the figure of 2,230 recorded in 2000.

History
The Pawnee Agency and Pawnee Boarding School were established after the Pawnee tribe came to this area in 1875. The Pawnee Agency was designated as a post office on May 4, 1876. The area was opened to non-Indian settlers on September 16, 1893, during the Cherokee Outlet Opening. Townsite Number Thirteen (later Pawnee) had been designated as the temporary county seat. The post office was redesignated from Pawnee Agency to Pawnee on October 26, 1893. The town incorporated on April 16, 1894. On September 9, 1895, the townspeople dedicated a stone county courthouse.

The Eastern Oklahoma Railway, which later became part of the Atchison, Topeka and Santa Fe Railway, built a line through Pawnee between 1900 and 1902. In 1902, the Arkansas Valley and Western Railway (later the St. Louis and San Francisco Railway) also built a line through the city. The railroads enabled Pawnee to develop as an agricultural trade center. The population was 1,943 at statehood in 1907.

Pawnee continued to develop during the Great Depression, largely because of Federal works projects. A hospital to care for the Ponca, Pawnee, Kaw, Otoe, and Tonkawa people opened January 15, 1931. A new school building at the Osage Agency opened in 1932. The federal government built a reservoir named Pawnee Lake in 1932. A new county courthouse was also built in 1932.

Geography
Pawnee is located at  (36.336260, -96.801494).

Demographics

As of the census of 2000, there were 2,230 people, 878 households, and 581 families residing in the city. The population density was 1,015.4 people per square mile (391.4/km). There were 1,054 housing units at an average density of 479.9 per square mile (185.0/km). The racial makeup of the city was 63.18% White, 3.59% African American, 27.89% Native American, 0.18% from other races, and 5.16% from two or more races. Hispanic or Latino of any race were 1.03% of the population.

There were 878 households, out of which 33.3% had children under the age of 18 living with them, 45.7% were married couples living together, 17.2% had a female householder with no husband present, and 33.8% were non-families. 32.0% of all households were made up of individuals, and 16.5% had someone living alone who was 65 years of age or older. The average household size was 2.44 and the average family size was 3.08.

In the city, the population was spread out, with 27.4% under the age of 18, 7.3% from 18 to 24, 24.4% from 25 to 44, 22.7% from 45 to 64, and 18.2% who were 65 years of age or older. The median age was 39 years. For every 100 females, there were 84.3 males. For every 100 females age 18 and over, there were 80.6 males.

The median income for a household in the city was $24,962, and the median income for a family was $32,850. Males had a median income of $28,182 versus $20,139 for females. The per capita income for the city was $12,970. About 16.8% of families and 20.5% of the population were below the poverty line, including 25.9% of those under age 18 and 23.4% of those age 65 or over.

Government
Pawnee has an aldermanic form of government.

2016 earthquake

A 5.8-magnitude earthquake struck near Pawnee on September 3, 2016, causing cracks and minor damage to buildings. It was the strongest recorded earthquake in state history, exceeding the 5.7 magnitude 2011 earthquake near Prague, Oklahoma.

Items of interest

 The Pawnee Indian Veterans Homecoming and Powwow, which occurs the weekend that falls closest to the 4th of July.
 Served by Meridian Technology Center
 Pawnee High School
 Home of the Pawnee people and government.
Pawnee Lake, consisting of 530 surface acres with boating, fishing, and camping, and having a 9-hole golf course and horse facilities adjacent.
 Pawnee Bill Historical Museum, with exhibits related to Pawnee Bill, the Wild West Shows and the Pawnees.
 Oklahoma Steam and Gas Engine Show.  This annual event by the Oklahoma Steam Threshers and Gas Engine Association is during the first Friday, Saturday and Sunday in May.
 Pawnee Bill Memorial Rodeo.  The event typically includes a Western Heritage Week, a Draft Horse and Mule Sale, an "Old Time Saturday Night" Car-Cruze-In, a youth rodeo, and a Ranch Rodeo.
 Pawnee Bill’s Original Wild West Show  
 Large Dick Tracy wall mural
 Pawnee County Historical Society Museum & Dick Tracy Headquarters.  The Museum preserves the names, places and history of the Pawnee community, displays artifacts from area ghost towns, shows pieces of Pawnee Tribe history, and showcases Dick Tracy memorabilia.

Historic Sites

Eight of 12 NRHP-listed sites in Pawnee County are located in Pawnee, including:
Arkansas Valley National Bank
Blue Hawk Peak Ranch, a/k/a the Pawnee Bill Ranch
Corliss Steam Engine, at the Pawnee County Fairgrounds
Pawnee Agency and Boarding School Historic District
Pawnee Armory
Pawnee County Courthouse
Pawnee Indian Agency
Pawnee Municipal Swimming Pool and Bathhouse

Notable people
 Kenneth D. Bailey, Medal of Honor recipient
 Carter Camp, Native American activist
 Chester Gould, cartoonist, creator of Dick Tracy
 Saginaw Grant, actor, dancer, and motivational speaker 
 Clyde LeForce, selected by the Detroit Lions in the 19th round of the 1945 NFL Draft
 Gordon W. Lillie (aka Pawnee Bill), Wild West Show presenter
 May Lillie, Wild West Show performer, sharpshooter and equestrian
 John J. Mathews, historian
 Neil E. McNeil, was city and county judge of Pawnee (1905-11), then Associate Justice of the Oklahoma Supreme Court (1914-1919)
 Jennie Stevenson (aka Little Britches), female bandit associated with her companion in crime, Cattle Annie, escaped from custody temporarily from a restaurant in Pawnee in 1895.
 Della Warrior (b. 1946), born in Pawnee, served as first (and so far, only) female chair of the Otoe-Missouria Tribe. Also was president of the Institute of American Indian Arts.
 Moses J. "Chief" YellowHorse, first full blooded Native American Pro Baseball Player (Pittsburgh Pirates, 1921-2)
 Steve Ripley, musician, leader of The Tractors

References

External links
 City of Pawnee
 Pawnee County Historical Society
 Pawnee Nation of Oklahoma and Nebraska
 Pawnee Nation College
 Pawnee Public Schools

 
Cities in Pawnee County, Oklahoma
Cities in Oklahoma
County seats in Oklahoma
Tulsa metropolitan area